During the 1997–98 English football season, Leicester City competed in the FA Premier League (known as the FA Carling Premiership for sponsorship reasons).

Season summary
Leicester City's return to European competition for the first time since the 1960s was short-lived, and they suffered a first-hurdle defeat at the hands of Spanish team Atlético Madrid. Their challenges in the domestic cups fared little better, and a 10th-place finish in the final table was not enough for another UEFA Cup adventure. But they managed to hold on to star players like Neil Lennon and Emile Heskey, and, most importantly, highly rated manager Martin O'Neill, giving fans hope of another challenge for honours in 1998–99.

Final league table

Results summary

Results by round

Results

Pre-season

FA Premier League

FA Cup

League Cup

UEFA Cup

Squad

Left club during season

Reserve squad

Club staff

{| class="wikitable" style="text-align:left;"
|-
!colspan=2 style="color:white; background:#2B55DB;"|First Team Management & Youth Team Management
|-
! style="width:290px;"|Role !! style="width:150px;"|Person
|-
| First Team Manager ||  Martin O'Neill
|-
| First Team Assistant Manager ||  John Robertson
|-
| First Team Coach ||  Steve Walford
|-
| Goalkeeping Team Coach ||  Jim McDonagh
|-
| Reserve Team Coach ||  Paul Franklin
|-
| Physiotherapist || Mick Yeoman
|-
| Physiotherapist || Alan Smith
|-
| Youth Academy Manager ||  David Nish
|-
| Head Coach of Youth Development ||  Neville Hamilton
|-
| Youth Development Officer || Steve Sims
|-
| Chief Scout ||  Jim Melrose
|-
| Kit Manager ||  Paul McAndrew
|-

Transfers

In

Out

Transfers in:  £2,750,000
Transfers out:  £2,325,000
Total spending:  £525,000

Statistics

Appearances, goals and cards
(Starting appearances + substitute appearances)

Notes

References

1997-98 
Leicester City